The Kettle Moraine Correctional Institution is a medium security prison located 10 miles west of Plymouth, Wisconsin. The facility is located off Wisconsin Highway 67 just east of the Sheboygan/Fond du Lac County line.

History
The institution was opened in 1962 as the Wisconsin School for Boys, a juvenile facility. It was converted to an adult medium security prison in 1974 when Lincoln Hills School was expanded.

References

External links 
Moraine Correctional Institution
Life In Wisconsin Prisons And Beyond

Prisons in Wisconsin
Buildings and structures in Sheboygan County, Wisconsin
1962 establishments in Wisconsin